Musansha Shinbun (Japanese: 無産者新聞; Proletarian News) was one of the newspapers which were affiliated with the Japanese Communist Party. The paper was in circulation between 1925 and 1929.

History and profile
Musansha Shinbun was launched in Tokyo in 1925. The first issue appeared in September that year and was started as a biweekly publication. The paper published news based on a working class perspective. From January 1926 the frequency of Musansha Shinbun was switched to weekly, and it was later published six times per month. In 1928 its circulation was reported to be 35,000 copies.

Musansha Shinbun was subject to frequent bans during its lifetime. It ceased publication in August 1929 when it was banned. The paper was succeeded by Daini Musansha Shinbun (Japanese: Second Proletarian News).

References

Further reading
 

1925 establishments in Japan
1929 disestablishments in Japan
Banned newspapers
Communist newspapers
Defunct newspapers published in Japan
Japanese Communist Party
Japanese-language newspapers
Newspapers published in Tokyo
Publications established in 1925
Publications disestablished in 1929
Biweekly newspapers
Defunct weekly newspapers